Alexander Williams Randall (October 31, 1819July 26, 1872) was a lawyer, judge and politician from Wisconsin. He served as the sixth Governor of Wisconsin from 1858 until 1861. He was instrumental in raising and organizing the first Wisconsin volunteer troops for the Union Army during the American Civil War.

Life and career
Randall was born in Ames, New York, on October 31, 1819. His father, Phineas, was judge of the court of common pleas there from 1837 to 1841. Randall attended Cherry Valley Academy in New York then studied law with his father. He was admitted to the bar in New York at age 19. Shortly after that, he moved to Wisconsin Territory. He opened a law practice in Waukesha in 1840, where he became postmaster in 1845.

Randall was a delegate to the state's first constitutional convention in 1846. There he successfully advocated for a resolution that would put the question of "Negro suffrage" to a statewide referendum. He was elected to the Wisconsin State Assembly for the 1855 session and was the Republican Party's first candidate for Attorney General of Wisconsin, running unsuccessfully in the 1855 election. From 1855 to 1857, he was a circuit judge in Milwaukee.

Randall was elected governor in 1857 as a Republican, and won re-election in 1859.  He was a dark horse candidate in 1857.  The two principal candidates in the convention that year were Edward D. Holton of Milwaukee and Walter McIndoe of Wausau.  Holton's abolitionist passions and his connections with the Milwaukee elite gave him strong support, but McIndoe's more rough-hewn personality resonated better with the frontier character of the state at the time. As such, they split the vote, neither able to garner a majority for the nomination. When it became apparent that the convention was at an impasse, and the delegates were released from their obligation, the votes eventually were cast in favor of Randall, the obvious compromise candidate.

Prior to the beginning of the Civil War, he was an ardent abolitionist and proposed that Wisconsin secede from the Union if Abraham Lincoln did not win the presidency.

As governor, Randall conducted an investigation of fraud in the distribution of federal railroad land grants in Wisconsin perpetrated by his predecessor, Republican Governor Coles Bashford.

Civil War
Once war began Randall raised 18 regiments, 10 artillery batteries, and three cavalry units before leaving office, exceeding Wisconsin's quota by 3,232 men. The Union Army created a military camp from the former state fairgrounds in Madison, Wisconsin, and named it "Camp Randall" after the governor. Camp Randall Stadium is now located on the site of the military camp.

In 1861, President Abraham Lincoln appointed Randall U.S. Minister to the Papal States. He was succeeded by Richard Milford Blatchford, and, in 1863, accepted appointment as Assistant Postmaster General. President Andrew Johnson appointed him United States Postmaster General in 1866 and he remained in that position until 1869. When Johnson was impeached, Randall remained loyal, testifying on Johnson's behalf and contributing to his defense fund.

After leaving the federal government, Randall moved to Elmira, New York, where he resumed practicing law. He died there July 26, 1872. He is buried in Woodlawn Cemetery.

Electoral history

Wisconsin Attorney General

| colspan="6" style="text-align:center;background-color: #e9e9e9;"| General Election, November 6, 1855

Wisconsin Governor

| colspan="6" style="text-align:center;background-color: #e9e9e9;"| General Election, November 3, 1857

| colspan="6" style="text-align:center;background-color: #e9e9e9;"| General Election, November 8, 1859

References

Further reading 
 Brown, Reuben Samuel Tilden. The War Administration of Alexander Randall. Master's thesis, University of Wisconsin, 1921. At Google Books;  at University of Wisconsin-Madison Libraries

External links
 Randall, Gov. Alexander W. (1819–1872) | Wisconsin Historical Society

|-

1819 births
1872 deaths
Republican Party governors of Wisconsin
People from Montgomery County, New York
Politicians from Waukesha, Wisconsin
United States Postmasters General
People of Wisconsin in the American Civil War
Wisconsin lawyers
Ambassadors of the United States to the Holy See
Republican Party members of the Wisconsin State Assembly
Andrew Johnson administration cabinet members
Union (American Civil War) state governors
American abolitionists
19th-century American politicians
19th-century American diplomats
Burials at Woodlawn Cemetery (Elmira, New York)
Activists from Wisconsin
Testifying witnesses of the impeachment trial of Andrew Johnson